Pudeh may refer to:
 Pudeh, Gilan
 Pudeh, Isfahan